Karen Demirchyan Sports and Concerts Complex, also known as Demirchyan Arena, Sports & Music Complex, or simply Hamalir (for complex in Armenian), is a large multi-purpose sports and concert complex with 184 stairs leading up Tsitsernakaberd hill which dominates over the western parts of Yerevan, near the Hrazdan River gorge.

The complex consists of two main halls; the Concerts hall and the Sports hall, in addition to the large foyer, Hayastan conference hall and Argishti hall designated for diplomatic meetings, exhibitions and other events. In August 2015, the government of Armenia decided to sell the complex to a private firm with plans to renovate the complex and turn it into a "family-oriented center".

History

The complex was opened in 1983 but forced to close within a year and a half after a fire in 1985. A renovation process took place until the end of 1987 when it was ready again to host concerts and sport events. The complex was designed by a group of Armenian architects: A. Tarkhanian, S. Khachikyan, G. Pogosyan and G. Mushegyan. The construction process was supervised by engineers: Hamlet Badalyan (chief engineer) and I. Tsaturian, A. Azizian and M. Aharonian.

In 1990, Ian Gillan's band has played concerts there. The 32nd Chess Olympiad in 1996 and the 2001 World Wushu Championships also took place at the venue.

In 1999, shortly after the assassination of the former speaker of the Armenian parliament Karen Demirchyan in the Armenian parliament shooting, the complex was renamed in honour of him, for his contribution in the construction and the renovation of the complex during the Soviet era.

On October 9, 2005, the complex was sold for US$5.7 million. The contract was signed between the Armenian Government and the Russian BAMO Holding Company. Murad Muradian, an Armenian from Moscow, the head of the BAMO holding, attempted to gain the support of Yerevan citizens who were hesitant about the privatization of the building. Two conditions were put forward by Armenian president Robert Kocharyan: The name of the complex must not be changed and it must preserve its functional meaning. The organization agreed to these conditions and a commitment to make an investment of nearly 10 million US dollars was envisaged for the upcoming 3 years.

The renovation process took almost 3 years and its cost grew up to 42 million US dollars, thus turning the complex to a modern and a high level sports and concerts arena.

On October 31, 2008, exactly after 25 years of its first inauguration, the second opening ceremony of the Karen Demirchyan Sports and Concerts Complex took place with the presence of president Serzh Sargsyan, catholicos Karekin II, Karen Demirchyan's son Stepan Demirchyan and widow Rima, and a huge crowd of Yerevan's residents. Popular concerts and ice skating shows were included in the ceremony. The Russian figure skating legend Evgeni Plushenko was the surprise guest and performer of the day.

In August 2014, due to the accumulated debts of the owners, the Government of Armenia transferred the ownership of the complex to the Ministry of Defense.

In August 2015, the government of Armenia decided to sell the complex to NTAA Investment Group LLC, which planned to spend 4 years turning the complex into a "family-oriented center" that will include "hotels, [an] indoor waterpark, concert halls, meeting rooms, restaurants, shops and a casino."

Structure

The complex has a unique design, an outside view of the whole construction reminds the shape a big bird opening its wings. Its architectural concepts include a turning tribune of 1,008 seats, that can rapidly connect the two big halls to reveal additional seating, a concept for which the architects were awarded the USSR State Prize, the highest of its kind, in 1987.

The complex consists of the following halls:
The main arena used for sporting events and concerts with a capacity of 6,000 seats, expandable to 8,800 seats.
The concerts hall with a capacity 1,900 seats.
The sports hall with a capacity of 2,000 seats.
Hayastan conference hall.
Argishti hall for diplomatic meetings, 
Large foyer used for exhibitions and other events.

Notable events
After its renovation in 2008, the sports hall hosted a concert of one of the most renowned singers of Armenia and Armenian Diaspora, Harout Pamboukjian, while the concerts hall hosted the celebration concert of the 80th anniversary of the worldwide known Armenian musician and composer Djivan Gasparyan with songs and plays performed by Flora Martirosyan, Peter Gabriel, Pedro Eustache, Alan Parsons Project, Boris Grebenshchikov and others. The complex has also hosted many concerts performed by Paul Baghdadlian, André, Hayko, Arman Hovhannisyan and other Armenian singers.

 On 22 March 2009, the Canadian singer Garou performed at a concert in the sports hall within the frames of the Francophonie Days in Armenia.
 In May 2009, the main arena was home to the World Youth Boxing Championship.
 On 22 May 2009, British rock band Jethro Tull performed a concert in the sports hall.
 On 16 October 2009, the concerts hall was crowded with rock fans who came to enjoy the performance of the British rock band Uriah Heep.
 On 12 November 2009, the American jazz musician and singer George Benson performed a concert in the concert hall. The event was held within the framework of "Perspectives XXI" 10th Armenian international music festival.
 During April 2010, the arena hosted the 2010 IIHF World Championship (Division III) ice hockey tournament, where the Armenian team took a silver medal for Division III play after losing in the finals against North Korea.
 On 25 May 2010, the English rock band Deep Purple performed a charity concert with more than 10,000 fans filled the arena. The  concert was a benefit performance, with proceeds going towards the construction of a music school in Gyumri, devastated by the 1988 earthquake.
 On 12 August 2010, the Armenian-American rock singer Serj Tankian of the System of a Down, performed at the complex.
 On 26 October 2010, the English singer Joe Cocker performed a concert in the concert hall during his "Hard Knocks" world tour.
 On 18 March 2011, international singer Lara Fabian performed at a concert in the sports hall within the frames of the Francophone Days in Armenia.
 On 3 September 2011, Vic Darchinyan defended his IBO bantamweight title beating Evans Mbamba during a fight of 12 rounds.
 On 3 December 2011, the Junior Eurovision Song Contest 2011 was held in the main arena.
 On 10 September 2012, Armenian rock-band Dorians among with special guests Glenn Hughes and Derek Sherinian gave a joint concert.
 In June 2013 Russian rock-band DDT, while being first time in Armenia, performed a concert in the concert hall.
 In October 2015, Charles Aznavour performed a concert in the concert hall. He has a personal dressing room in the complex.
 On 26 October 2017, the American jazz musician Marcus Miller performed a concert in the concert hall. The event was held within the framework of "Yerevan Jazz Fest 2017" annual international festival.
 On 9 April 2018, President Armen Sarkissian was inaugurated as President of Armenia succeeding Serzh Sarkisian.
 On 11 December 2022, the venue hosted the 20th Junior Eurovision Song Contest.

See also
Chess in Armenia

References

External links

 About Karen Demirchyan Complex

1983 establishments in Armenia
1983 establishments in the Soviet Union
Sports venues completed in 1983
Event venues established in 1983
Sports venues in Yerevan
Buildings and structures in Yerevan
Indoor arenas built in the Soviet Union
Figure skating in Armenia
Tourist attractions in Yerevan
Indoor ice hockey venues in Armenia
Basketball venues in Armenia
Music venues in Armenia